Mya Aye (born 1940) is a Burmese professional golfer.

Mya Aye played on the Japan Golf Tour and the Asia Golf Circuit, winning twice on each tour.

Professional wins (6)

Japan Golf Tour wins (2)

Asia Golf Circuit wins (3)
1976 Indonesia Open
1979 Philippine Masters
1981 Singapore Open

Other wins (1)
1980 Gifuseki Open (Japan)

Results in major championships

CUT = missed the halfway cut
Note: Aye only played in The Open Championship.

Team appearances
World Cup (representing Burma): 1969, 1975, 1976, 1977, 1978, 1980

See also 

 1967 PGA Tour Qualifying School graduates

References

External links

Burmese male golfers
Japan Golf Tour golfers
Living people
1940 births